Rossiya Tournament 1978 was played in Kemerovo on 24-28 January 1978. The Soviet Union won the tournament.

The tournament was decided by round-robin results like a group stage.

Results

Sources 
 Norges herrlandskamper i bandy 
 Sverige-Sovjet i bandy 
 Rossija Tournament 

1978 in Soviet sport
1978 in bandy
1978